The White Sister is a 1915 American silent film produced by Essanay Studios. It is based on the 1909 play The White Sister by F. Marion Crawford and Walter Hackett. This film, directed by Fred E. Wright, stars Viola Allen, a prominent stage actress in her first movie. Allen had also created the role in the play and it was one of her biggest successes. It is not known whether the film survives.

Cast
Viola Allen – Donna Angela Chiaramonte
Richard C. Travers – Lt. Giovanni Severi
Florence Oberle – Princess Chiaramonte
Thomas Commerford – Monseigneur Saracinesca
Emilie Melville – Mother Superior (aka Emelie Melville)
John Thorn – Filmore Durand
Sidney Ainsworth – Captain Ugo Severi (*Sydney Ainsworth)
Ernest Maupain – Dr. Pieri
Camille D'Arcy – Madame Bernard
John H. Cossar – Minister of War (*aka John Cossar)
Frank Dayton – Colonel Parlo

References

External links
 

1915 films
American silent feature films
American films based on plays
Films based on adaptations
Films based on American novels
Films based on works by Francis Marion Crawford
Essanay Studios films
1915 drama films
Silent American drama films
American black-and-white films
Films directed by Fred E. Wright
1910s American films